Gold is a 1955 Canadian short documentary film, directed by Colin Low for the National Film Board of Canada. 

The film documents the process of placer gold mining near Dawson City, Yukon and shows how gold is trapped and hand-sorted before becoming gold brick. 

Low followed up with his 1957 film City of Gold, which centred on the history of Dawson City during the Klondike Gold Rush.

Awards
 Edinburgh International Film Festival, Edinburgh, Scotland: Diploma of Merit, 1955
 8th Canadian Film Awards, Stratford, Ontario: Gold Award, Theatrical Short 1956

References

1955 films
Canadian short documentary films
Best Theatrical Short Film Genie and Canadian Screen Award winners
National Film Board of Canada short films
1955 short films
Documentary films about mining
Films directed by Colin Low (filmmaker)
English-language Canadian films
1950s English-language films
1950s Canadian films
1955 documentary films